Bradford Town Football Club is a football club based in Bradford on Avon in Wiltshire, England.

History
The club was established in 1992 by Les and Pat Stevens, and joined the Division Two of the Wiltshire League. They were Division Two champions in 1993–94, earning promotion to Division One, which became the Premier Division in 1998. In 2004–05 Bradford were runners-up in the Premier Division and were promoted to Division One of the Western League. After five consecutive top-five finishes between 2008–09 and 2012–13, the club were Division One champions in 2013–14, earning promotion to the Premier Division. At the end of the 2020–21 season they were transferred to the Premier Division of the Hellenic League.

Ground
The club initially played at the St Laurence School on a roped-off pitch. After moving up to the top division of the Wiltshire League, the club moved to Trowbridge Town's Frome Road ground, where they remained until moving back to Bradford on Avon in 1996 to move into the Bradford on Avon Sports and Social Club. Floodlights were installed during the 2008–09 season and inaugurated by Steve Phillips. A 100-seat stand was erected the following season. The club's record attendance of 621 was set in 2015 for an FA Vase fourth round match against Melksham Town.

Honours
Western League
Division One champions 2012–13
Wiltshire League
Division Two champions 1993–94

Records
Best FA Cup performance: Second qualifying round, 2015–16
Best FA Vase performance: Fifth round, 2014–15, 2017–18, 2019–20
Record attendance: 621 vs Melksham Town, FA Vase fourth round, 2015

References

External links
Official website

Football clubs in England
Football clubs in Wiltshire
Association football clubs established in 1992
Bradford-on-Avon
1992 establishments in England
Wiltshire Football League
Western Football League
Hellenic Football League